Dell Precision is a series of computer workstations for CAD/architecture/CG professionals.

Dell Precision mobile workstations 
The 7000 series introduced Compression Attached Memory Module (CAMM).

3000, 5000, 7000 Series (2015–current) 

Dell announced a new series of Latitude laptops in August 2013: the 3000 series, the 5000 series and the 7000 series. 
In October 2015, Dell announced the first generation of Precision mobile workstations of this series with model numbers 3510, 5510, 7510 and 7710. 
In January 2017, Dell announced the second generation laptops in this series with model numbers 3520, 5520, 7520 and 7720.

In April 2018, Dell announced the third generation of laptops in this series with model numbers 3530, 5530, 7530 and 7730. In May 2019 Dell announced the 4th Generation of the 55xx and 7xxx series mobile workstations with the release of the 5540, 7540 and 7740 models.

Docks/Port Replicators - All first generation (xx10) and second generation (xx20) Precision mobile workstation laptops support the Dell E-Series port replicator except XPS based 5510, 3520, 5520 models. All third generation (xx30) and higher support USB-C docks with some compatible with Thunderbolt 3 or 4 based on options or generation. Specific compatibility, charging/display limitations, or dual USB-C requirements exist requiring verification from Dell.

Precision Mobile Thin & Light (XPS 15 based) (2013–2015)

Latitude E Series based (2008–2014) 

Dell launched the E Series of laptops on August 12, 2008 with a collection of Latitude (E4200, E5400, E5500, E6400, E6500, E6400 ATG/XFR) and Precision (M4400, M2400) computers. Both the Latitude and Precision computers are compatible with the new E Series docking stations (E-Port and E-Port Plus). Notably, the 17" models do not share a chassis with the Inspiron series anymore, and starting with the M4600 the 15" Precisions do not share a Latitude chassis either. QHD, UHD and RGBLED IPS models have a disabled iGPU. This has several downsides: the power consumption during low load is high and thus the battery runtimes clearly suffer despite the high-capacity battery, and Intel's QuickSync Video cannot be used. AMD GPU equipped models before the M4800/M6800 also do not support AMD Enduro Switchable Graphics.

Latitude D Series based (2003–2007) 
These Precision models were released at roughly the same time as their D-series Latitude counterparts. They are compatible with the D-series docking stations, and there are various accessories that are interchangeable with other Dell models, such as the battery or CD drive, depending on the Precision model. Some of these models (especially those made around ~2005-2007) with NVIDIA GPUs can suffer from GPU failure.

Latitude C Series based (2001–2002) 
These Precisions were based on the Latitude C810 and C840, which in turn were based on the Inspiron 8100 and 8200.

Dell Precision fixed workstations

Single processor

Single processor, All-In-One form factor

Dual processor, desktop form factor

Dual processor, tower form factor

Rack-mounted

References

External links 
 Dell Precision Workstations
 Dell Precision Mobile Workstations
 Precision T7600 user manual
 Precision T3500 technical guide
 inforocked.com

See also 

 Lenovo ThinkStation
 Fujitsu Celsius
 Mac Pro
 HP Z

Computer-related introductions in 1997
Precision
Computer workstations
X86-based computers
Mobile workstations